Rush Christopher Hawkins (September 14, 1831 – October 25, 1920) was a lawyer, Union colonel in the American Civil War, politician, book collector, and art patron. He was mustered out of the Union Army in 1863 but served in the New York Militia in 1865. In 1866, in consideration of his prior service, he was nominated and confirmed for appointment to the grade of brevet brigadier general of volunteers to rank from March 13, 1865.

Early life
Hawkins was born in Pomfret, Vermont to Lorenzo Dow Hawkins and Maria Louisa (Hutchinson) Hawkins. At age 15, Hawkins enlisted in the 2nd United States Dragoons for service in the Mexican–American War. After the war, he settled in New York City where he studied law.

Hawkins married Annmary Brown in 1860; she died in January 1903 of pneumonia.

Civil War
In 1861, Hawkins helped raise the 9th New York Infantry, a Zouave-styled regiment, popularly known as "Hawkins Zouaves" for service in the Civil War. Hawkins was appointed colonel of the regiment on May 4, 1861, and served with distinction in North Carolina early in the war. He was part of Benjamin F. Butler's expedition to capture Fort Hatteras in 1861.  Expecting to win a promotion to brigadier general for his service at Fort Hatteras he was instead relieved of command for insubordination. On October 8, 1861, a disgruntled Hawkins wrote "brigadier generals are made of such queer stuff nowadays, that I should not esteem it any great honor to be made one." Hawkins would in fact receive a brevet promotion to brigadier general in 1866 to rank from March 13, 1865. Despite his belligerence an early dispatch of Hawkins' caught the attention of President Abraham Lincoln. Hawkins was invited to the White House to confer with the President and General-in-Chief George B. McClellan. There he was instrumental in convincing the Union high command of the possibility of a combined operation against Pamlico Sound in North Carolina.

The idea became the objective Ambrose Burnside's North Carolina Expedition. Hawkins was again conspicuous at the battles of Roanoke Island and New Bern in 1862. Upon the arrival of significant reinforcements to North Carolina in April 1862, he assumed command of a brigade. Hawkins' brigade was attached to Jesse L. Reno's division and fought at the battle of South Mills on April 19, 1862, where he was wounded in the left arm.

After recovering Hawkins returned to Virginia with his regiment and briefly commanded the 1st Brigade, 3rd Division in the newly formed IX Corps.  He was not present with the brigade during the Maryland Campaign but resumed command during the battle of Fredericksburg.  After Fredericksburg, the 3rd Division, commanded by George W. Getty, was transferred to the VII Corps in southeast Virginia.  Hawkins led his brigade (now the 1st Brigade, 2nd Division, VII Corps) during the siege of Suffolk.  Just two days before the siege was lifted, Hawkins turned over command of his brigade and on May 20, 1863, was mustered out of the volunteer service with his old regiment. He did not return to active duty. On July 9, 1866, President Andrew Johnson nominated Hawkins for appointment to the grade of brevet brigadier general of volunteers, to rank from March 13, 1865, and the United States Senate confirmed the appointment on July 23, 1866.  He remained active in the New York Militia receiving a brevet promotion to brigadier general of New York Militia in 1865.

Later life
Hawkins was a Republican member of the New York State Assembly (New York Co., 11th D.) in 1872. He became a noted—and certainly obsessive—rare book collector, having started shortly before the Civil War.  He amassed a collection of 225 incunabula; his goal was to have the first and second books from every European printer before 1501.  Remarkably, he was able to acquire 130 of the 238 known fifteenth century European printers.  In 1990, the book collection was moved from the Annmary Brown Memorial at Brown University and transferred to the John Hay Library.

Hawkins and his wife were also avid art collectors and created an excellent collection of 19th century American art.  Hawkins was appointed Assistant to the Commissioner General for the United States Commission to the 1889 Universal Exposition in Paris, France.  Hawkins was "Commissaire Expert des Beaux Arts" and was responsible for selecting and organizing American art works for the exhibition.  Hawkins feuded with James McNeill Whistler, who removed all of his work in protest and later wrote The Gentle Art of Making Enemies (1890), which in-part details his experiences with Hawkins.

While attempting to cross the street in front of his home at 42 5th Avenue in New York City, Hawkins was struck by an automobile and died from his injuries on October 25, 1920.  He is buried with his wife in a crypt at the Annmary Brown Memorial on the Brown University campus in Providence, Rhode Island.

See also

 List of American Civil War brevet generals (Union)
 Annmary Brown Memorial

Notes

External links
 
 
 
 
 Annmary Brown Memorial at Brown University
 "The Missing Sword Returns", Brown Alumni Magazine, Sept/Oct 2013

American book and manuscript collectors
American military personnel of the Mexican–American War
People of New York (state) in the American Civil War
Union Army generals
1831 births
1920 deaths
Road incident deaths in New York City
Pedestrian road incident deaths
People from Pomfret, Vermont